Macrosia fumeola is a moth of the subfamily Arctiinae. It was described by Francis Walker in 1854. It is found in Eritrea, Lesotho, South Africa and Tanzania.

References

 

Lithosiini
Moths described in 1854